Stephen Kevin Burley is a British-born scientist, naturalized in both Canada and the United States, specializing in oncology and structural biology. He is a University Professor and Henry Rutgers Chair at Rutgers, The State University of New Jersey. Burley directs the RCSB Protein Data Bank (a member of the Worldwide Protein Data Bank), the Center for Integrative Proteomics Research, and the Institute for Quantitative Biomedicine.

Career
Burley has a Bachelor in physics from the University of Western Ontario and a D.Phil from Oxford University, England in Molecular Biophysics as a Rhodes scholar. Burley has an M.D. from Harvard Medical School.

He worked with Gregory A. Petsko and William N. Lipscomb at MIT and Harvard. He was faculty at Howard Hughes Medical Institute and Rockefeller University. 
Burley co-founded Prospect Genomics, Inc, a computational genomics pharma. He was Chief Scientific Officer of SGX Pharmaceuticals after it acquired Prospect. SGX was in turn merged with Eli Lilly in 2008 where Burley was a Distinguished Lilly Research Scholar in Lilly Research Laboratories

In 2012 Burley joined Rutgers  as Director of the Center for Integrative Proteomics Research and became director of the RCSB PDB (US regional data center for the worldwide PDB) in 2014, succeeding Prof. Helen Berman

He is a member of the Editorial Board for Oncogene.

Honors and awards
 Fellow of the Royal Society of Canada (elected 1995)

References

Living people
Rutgers University faculty
British crystallographers
Alumni of the University of Oxford
Fellows of the Royal Society of Canada
American Rhodes Scholars
University of Western Ontario alumni
1958 births
Harvard Medical School alumni